DJ Tillu is a 2022 Indian Telugu-language romantic crime comedy film directed by debutant Vimal Krishna who co-wrote the film with Siddhu Jonnalagadda. Produced by Sithara Entertainments, the film stars Jonnalagadda as the title character alongside Neha Shetty, Prince Cecil, and Brahmaji.

The film was announced in October 2020 under the title Narudi Brathuku Natana. Principal photography began in February 2021 with filming taking place in Hyderabad. The film's music is scored by S. Thaman while the soundtrack is composed by Sricharan Pakala and Ram Miriyala. Initially scheduled to be released on 14 January 2022, it was postponed due to the COVID-19 pandemic in India.

DJ Tillu was released theatrically on 12 February 2022. Despite mixed reviews from critics, the film was successful at the box office. A sequel, titled Tillu Square, is scheduled to begin its production.

Plot 
Bala Gangadhar Tilak alias DJ Tillu, is a young man who wants be a DJ. One day, he meets Radhika in a club and asks her for a drink to which she agrees. After the drinks, Tillu drops Radhika at her apartment. While walking towards her apartment, she calls her boyfriend, Rohit, but she hears the sound of another girl with him and confirms that he is cheating on her. She decides to pay back her boyfriend and begins a relationship with Tillu.

A few weeks later, on Tillu's birthday, Rohit shows images of Radhika and Tillu together and threatens to expose them. On the other hand, Radhika leaks about the affair that Rohit was having and decides to leave the apartment. She then goes into her room to pack her luggage and an enraged Rohit tries to assault her. In self-defense, Radhika pushes Rohit, which causes him to hit his head on the wall and die from the injury. Radhika calls Tillu and tells him to come to her apartment. Tillu arrives and sees all the photos in the room with Rohit and also Rohit's dead body. Tillu, being scared, tells Radhika that he wants to call the police.

However, Radhika does not want to call the police as she is afraid that she will be sentenced to prison for killing Rohit. She explains everything to Tillu and they decide to bury the body somewhere. When they were burying Rohit's body, a drunk man named Chandrakant sees them bury the body and films the entire process. Chandrakant stops Tillu and Radhika, and blackmails them to provide 25 lakh in two days in order for the video not to be leaked. Radhika suggests that she knows a club and the club's owner Shannon, does illegal business and can obtain the money from him. She then manages to seduce Shannon and steals 2 crore. Frustrated on how Radhika obtains the money and seeing the way she seduces Shannon, Tillu gets into an argument Radhika about it.

Seeing the fight ensure, CI Rao stops Tillu and Radhika. To escape from the situation, Radhika tells that she does not know Tillu and that she needs to be dropped at her house. Shannon later finds Tillu at a tea stall and asks him about the money. Tillu tells that it was in his car and gets Shannon to drive to the earlier spot, but the car and the money are missing. He then finds the car and Radhika at the spot where they buried Rohit and Shannon finds his money. Radhika explains that Rao actually came into her apartment and found blood and threatened that he would get her arrested and attempts to assault her, but manages to escape. Later, they are chased by Rao and Shannon is thrown out of the car.

However, Tillu and Radhika escape and reaches a hotel with the money. Radhika explains to Tillu that she tried to give the money to Chandrakant, but he also tried to assault her, which made her to leave the premises. Tillu goes to the restroom and in this timespan, Radhika leaves the hotel with the money. Shannon and Rao find Tillu in the hotel room and beat him to the point where he goes into a coma and loses his memory. Tillu is then admitted to the hospital, where Shannon and Rao interrogate Tillu for the money and the cop's phone. With Tillu not remembering what happened, the cop files a case in court with Radhika and attempts to get them both arrested for the murder.

At court, it is revealed that Tillu actually bribed Chandrakant and Rao's colleague with a video and manages to get both Radhika and Rao arrested. A month later, Tillu visits Radhika in prison and explains that he never lost his memory and made a plan to find Radhika and obtains the money by bribing a music director, who behaved rudely with Radhika. He manages to issue a bail order and gets Radhika released. Tillu explains that he only helped her, because he felt bad for her. Later, Shannon calls Tillu and asks for his money, where Tillu tells him that the money is in Paris and that the story would continue from there.

Cast 

 Siddhu Jonnalagadda as Bala Gangadhar Tilak alias "DJ Tillu"
Neha Shetty as M. Radhika
 Prince Cecil as Shannon Gonzales, club owner
 Brahmaji as Inspector Rao
 Fish Venkat as Head Constable Fish
 Pragathi as Judge I. Sharada Devi
 Narra Srinivas as Chandrakant
 Raja Ravindra as Music Director
 Kireeti Damaraju as Photographer Rohit, Radhika's boyfriend
 Muralidhar Goud as Tillu's father
 Praneeth Reddy Kallem as Marcus, Tillu's friend

Production

Development and casting 
Vimal Krishna narrated the storyline of the film to actor Jonnalagadda in 2019, but got delayed in further production due to COVID-19 pandemic in India. The film was announced in October 2020 under the title Narudi Brathuku Natana. Director Trivikram Srinivas also guided Krishna and the team in designing the story and screenplay of the film. In an interview with The New Indian Express, Vimal Krishna revealed about the Tillu's character that, "During my initial days in Hyderabad, I happened to meet and interact with a few DJs and was really bowled over by their conversations, attitude and body language. They carry a different persona and each one is his own boss. I have infused these characteristics and developed Tillu's character". In January 2021, the film was then officially launched under the same title.

The film's title was then changed to DJ Tillu in an uncited reason. About his character 'Tillu' in the film, Jonnalagadda told The Hindu that "I grew up in areas near Padmarao Nagar (in Hyderabad). Youngsters in Warasiguda and Chilkalguda talk like Tillu (the Hyderabadi Telangana dialect). We wanted Tillu to reflect on how these youngsters speak and how they handle things. Each one is his own boss and for no reason, there is the rivalry between gangs from each street. These boys are also more chilled out than those in, say, Banjara Hills."

Filming 
Principal photography for the film began in February 2021 but was then later stopped due to the second lockdown in India. Filming was then resumed in June 2021.

Soundtrack 

Sricharan Pakala and Ram Miriyala composed the film's soundtrack. The audio rights were acquired by Aditya Music. In early-January 2022, S. Thaman joined the production to compose the film score. Soon after, the first song "Tillu Anna DJ Pedithe" was released on 6 January 2022. Sung and composed by Ram Miriyala, the song became an instant chartbuster. The second song "Pataas Pilla" sung by Anirudh Ravichander, was released on 24 January 2022. The third song "Nuvvala" sung by Jonnalagadda, was released on 7 February 2022. While the female version of the song later released through the album on 9 February 2022.

Release 
The film was initially scheduled to release on 14 January 2022 coinciding with the festival of Sankranthi due to the postponement of films such as RRR and Radhe Shyam. However, due to the restrictions on cinema due to COVID-19 pandemic in India the film was postponed. It was later decided that the film was going to release on 11 February 2022 along with Khiladi. In order to avoid the clash with Khiladi, DJ Tillu was then postponed to 12 February 2022.

Home media 
The post-theatrical digital streaming rights were acquired by Aha. It was premiered on 4 March 2022. Later the film's satellite rights were acquired by Star Maa.

Reception

Critical reception 
DJ TIllu opened to mixed reviews with some critics praising the "madcap fun moments" and while others criticised the narration. Thadhagath Pathi of The Times of India gave the film 3/5 and wrote "DJ Tillu relies heavily on dialogue and less on the actual story at hand. Such films usually end up being the perfect weekend watch, so this one's for you if you enjoy humour". Pinkvilla gave the film a rating of 3/5 and wrote "DJ Tillu has more 'mass' in it than the introductory songs for top stars in mass masala movies. And Thaman's background music hits the ball out of the park, designed to make the scenes look like they have been choreographed to enable the BGM composer have a blast in the studio. The editing is solid, making the shots look consummately etched".123Telugu gave the film a rating of 3 out of 5 and wrote "DJ is a timepass comedy which has standout performance by Siddhu Jonnalagadda. You will love his character and the comedy that he generates. The film has no strong storyline and rushed situations but when the hero's character is so strong and the situations give you ample entertainment, you should give this film a shot and have a good weekend".

Deccan Chronicle gave the film a rating of 3 out of 5 and wrote "DJ Tillu is a breezy entertainer that has elements of fun and quirkiness. The writing was cool, but goes overboard towards the end. Watch out for Siddu's characterisation and performance". The Hans India gave the film a rating of 2.5 out of 5 and wrote "Vimal tried to keep the audience to sit with his narration. Thaman's background score is an asset. He keeps the tempo with his techno sounding. The songs are neat. The cinematography is adequate. Dialogue writing is a huge plus for this romantic crime thriller".News18 stated "Director Vimal Krishna did well, though he could’ve stretched his limits more, experts say. The movie is a one-time watch for a few laughs in the first half". Sangeetha Devi Dundoo of The Hindu stated "Director Vimal Krishna helms a laughter riot populated with quirky, morally ambiguous characters".

Box office 
DJ Tillu grossed  worldwide on its opening day, with  coming from Andhra Pradesh and Telangana. According to Pinkvilla, the film emerged as the first commercially successful Telugu film of 2022. By the end of its theatrical run, DJ Tillu collected a worldwide gross of  crore with a distributor's share of  crore.

Sequel 
In February 2022 before the film's release, Jonnalagadda stated that they were planning a sequel for the film. "There are no limits to Tillu's character and I think, this can be explored and stretched to any length," he added. DJ Tillu sequel was officially announced in June 2022 by producer Naga Vamsi. Mallik Ram, of Naruda Donoruda and Adbhutham fame, was announced as the director, replacing Vimal Krishna. Principal photography of the sequel is scheduled to begin in August 2022. On Deepawali 2022, the title of the sequel was revealed as Tillu Square and it is scheduled to release in March 2023.

References

External links 

 

2020s Telugu-language films
2022 films
Indian romantic comedy films
2022 romantic comedy films
Films scored by Sricharan Pakala
Films scored by Ram Miriyala
Film productions suspended due to the COVID-19 pandemic
Films set in Hyderabad, India
Films shot in Hyderabad, India
Films scored by Thaman S
2022 directorial debut films
Romantic crime films